Randal Kirk II is an American film director, writer, producer, and cinematographer.

Career
Kirk graduated from the University of Denver with a BA in 2006. His first job out of college was to work for ManiaTV!. In 2009 he produced the pilot project Homeless Real World for the company. In 2010 was the director and producer of the short film Pawned, which was a Golden Duck award nominee for Best Short Narrative at the 2010 Beijing Film Festival. He is also a music video director. For example, in 2011 he directed the videos for King Fantastic's songs On Q and Why? Where? What?, and the video for Matt Zarley's song WTF. He also directed and produced the video for The Saga of Dirty Street Kids by The Pirate Signal. In 2011 he directed the short film The Working Man.

In 2012 Kirk directed and created the story for the feature film DGK: Parental Advisory, which according to ESPN, is "based on the adventures of a group of kids as they bump into the DGK riders", with the kids representing "younger versions of the DGK team". Kirk wrote much of the script, describing it as "Parental Advisory is a ghetto fairy tale that takes place inside the mind of the DGK rider Baby Scumbag aka Steven Fernandez". The film was nominated for the 2013 TransWorld SKATEboarding Award for best skateboarding video.

In 2013 Kirk directed the branded short skate film Casio Team G-Shock Stevie Williams Featuring G-Steel.

References

External links
Official website

University of Denver alumni
American film directors
American cinematographers
American male screenwriters
American film producers
Living people
Year of birth missing (living people)